Murrayfield Airport or Murray Field Airport  is located near Mandurah, Western Australia.

See also
 List of airports in Western Australia
 Aviation transport in Australia

References

External links
 Royal Aero Club of WA website
 Airservices Aerodromes & Procedure Charts

Airports in Western Australia
Shire of Murray